Ladislau "László" Incze II (17 October 1918 – 1969) was a Romanian footballer of Hungarian descent who played as a forward for teams such as Mureșul Târgu Mureș, Nagyváradi AC or Locomotiva Târgu Mureș, among others.

Ladislau Incze II was part of a family of athletes, his brothers Incze I and Incze III were also doing sports, Incze I being an ice hockey player. Apart of football, Incze II also played ice hockey for the team based in Târgu Mureș and his son, Ladislau Incze IV played football at the highest level in Romania.

International career
Incze II played at international level in 4 matches for Romania.

Honours
Mureșul Târgu Mureș
Divizia B: 1938–39

References

External links
 
 
 
 Ladislau Incze II at magyarfutball.hu

1918 births
1969 deaths
Sportspeople from Târgu Mureș
Romanian sportspeople of Hungarian descent
Romanian footballers
Romania international footballers
Association football forwards
Liga I players
Liga II players
Nemzeti Bajnokság I players
CA Oradea players